Taungthaman Le-sar Maung Pe Nge , was a royal artillery officer, noted poet, and a companion of  King Thibaw. He was granted the appendages of Taungthaman with the title of Taungthaman Le-sar (the Lord of the Taungthaman).

Biography
According to the royal chronicles, Maung Pe Nge was the grandson of the Princess of Magyitone, who was the daughter of Ananda Thiri (a royal concubine of King Bodawpaya), and Prince Min Ye Kyawswa of Shweku, the son of Bodawpaya by his consort, Madaya Myosa Mibaya. He served as an advisor and close confidante of Prince Thibaw. When Thibaw ascended the throne, he was appointed as a cavalry officer together with the Prince of Yanaung Maung Maung Toke, who was the commander of the Tavoy Regiment. He composes a number of romantic poems for himself and also on behalf of some members of the royal family. 

Maung Pe Nge was secretly in love with the beautiful lady named Daing Khin Khin, the daughter of the Duke of Kenni. However at the command of King Thibaw he helps to arrange an affaire de coeur between the King and Daing Khin Khin. When Supayalat found out that King Thibaw was in love with Daing Khin Khin, Maung Pe Nge, Maung Maung Toke, Daing Khin Khin and her family are all arrested by order of the Royal Court and charged with attempts to seize the throne. Maung Maung Toke committed suicide. Then Maung Pe Nge was sent to Bhamo and executed, but first, in April 1882, he managed to send a poem to Daing Khin Khin confessing his love and asking her to observe the obsequies for him. Unfortunately, she was already dead at the hands of the executioner, despite being pregnant with Thibaw Min's child. His story is still part of popular Burmese theater, and he is portrayed as a sad romantic figure.

According to other historical records, Maung Pe Nge is only on visiting terms with Daing Khin Khin and her family, but there is nothing of the love-relationship existing between
the two of them. Maung Pe Nge himself had long been married to Princess of Hingamaw, and two lesser ones. The aforesaid poem is in reality meant for his chief wife, but in order to build up the tragic climax the author takes the liberty of altering a word or two in the poem so that the addressee becomes Daing Khin Khin.

In popular culture
Maung Pe Nge is the subject of Seint's novel Daing Khin Khin, published in 1976.

References 

19th-century Burmese poets
Konbaung dynasty
1882 deaths
Year of birth missing